The Enhanced Digital Access Communication System (EDACS) is a radio communications protocol and product family invented in the General Electric Corporation in the mid 1980s.

History 
A young designer, Jeff Childress, created an autonomous radio base-station controller, known as the GETC (General Electric Trunking Card).  The GETC was a general-purpose controller with input/output optimized for radio system applications.

Childress and the team demonstrated that a smart controller could be adapted to a variety of applications, but his interest was really in fault tolerance.  The competition dealt with fault tolerance by means of the "brute force and ignorance" approach, deploying double the hardware for their controllers, and interconnecting them with massive and problematic relay banks .

The EDACS system architecture supported large communications footprints.  By making the GETC's "trunk" among themselves, one GETC per channel, the system was designed to be inherently fault-tolerant.  If one channel, or device, experienced problems, the others voted it off the network, and calls continued to be processed with the remaining resources .  This provided substantial hardware reductions, and the required software efforts yielded a variety of unique features and options.

This was not a new concept in systems design; however, few other teams have embodied it cleanly into such wide distribution.

Current status 
The EDACS system continues to be sold and supports a sizable portion of the market today for the public safety, public transit, and industrial two-way radio communications field .

EDACS was developed in competition with Motorola's Smartnet trunking system.  It claimed, and continues to hold, significant market share.  GE teamed with Sweden's Ericsson, and the company became Ericsson GE.  Later, GE exited the business.  Ericsson eventually sold the Private Radio Systems (PRS) unit to Com-Net in 2000, resulting in Com-Net Ericsson.  M/A-COM Inc., a holding of Tyco Electronics, acquired the business and technologies in May 2001, including many of the original team members, some of their children, and a few grandchildren who continue to manufacture and support the product family.

EDACS has the largest customer base of any technology in M/A-COM's portfolio (i.e. EDACS, OpenSky, P25 and TETRA).  Over 500 large-scale EDACS radio systems have been sold - with the State of Florida being the largest.  Hundreds of thousands of radios have been sold to function on these EDACS systems .

In April 2009 Harris Corporation (NYSE:HRS), an international communications and information technology company, acquired the Tyco Electronics Wireless Systems business (formerly known as M/A-COM).

Software 
Software for system managers and radio monitors alike has been developed outside of the vendor. ETrunker is a modification to the Trunker code to work on the EDACS control channel. Users of the software can monitor and log complete system activity. See the Trunker Site for more info.

ProVoice 
ProVoice is Tyco Electronics' (formerly M/A-COM, Ericsson and GE) implementation of IMBE digital modulation for radio communications. It is not APCO-25 compliant, but does use the same IMBE vocoder developed by  Digital Voice Systems, Inc. (DVSI). The technical difference between ProVoice and the APCO Project-25 standard is how error correction and modulation is provided to transmit the data.

References

External links 
EDACS Explained
Florida Statewide Law Enforcement Radio System (SLERS)
Harris Corporation website

Trunked radio systems
Speech codecs